Richard Bell (born September 2, 1937) is a retired high school and college football head coach. He previously served as head coach for the University of South Carolina Gamecocks for a single season in 1982.

After he graduated from the University of Arkansas, in 1962 Bell began his coaching career at VMI. From there he coached at Georgia Tech, West Virginia, Texas Tech and South Carolina as a defensive coach. On January 9, 1982, Bell was formally introduced as the 27th head coach in the history of the South Carolina program. Bell had previously served for seven seasons as the Gamecocks defensive coordinator under previous head coach Jim Carlen. After a disappointing 4–7 season, Bell was fired by athletic director Bob Marcum on December 1, 1982.

From South Carolina, Bell served as a defensive coach at several other schools. These schools included Duke, East Carolina, Georgia, Navy and Air Force. Bell retired as a collegiate coach after the 2006 season, after 42 years as a coach. After four years in retirement, Bell reentered the coaching world to serve as the defensive coordinator at Prince Avenue Christian School in Bogart, Georgia in 2010. He retired after the 2017 season.

Head coaching record

References

1937 births
Living people
Air Force Falcons football coaches
Arkansas Razorbacks football players
Duke Blue Devils football coaches
East Carolina Pirates football coaches
Georgia Bulldogs football coaches
Georgia Tech Yellow Jackets football coaches
Navy Midshipmen football coaches
South Carolina Gamecocks football coaches
Texas Tech Red Raiders football coaches
VMI Keydets football coaches
West Virginia Mountaineers football coaches
High school football coaches in Georgia (U.S. state)
Sportspeople from Little Rock, Arkansas